Yashavant Sardeshpande is an Indian actor, director, playwright. He conducts Kannada plays with his troupe Guru Samsthe, Hubli and Gurubala Entertainers. Sardeshpande was the scriptwriter for Kamal Haasan's dialogues in the North-Karnataka Kannada dialect in the Kannada feature film Rama Shama Bama. He has acted in many Kannada tele-serials and Kannada films, including Amruthadhare. He played the key role in organising Amerikannadotsava and Bahrain Kannadotsava.

Education 
He earned a diploma in Theatre Arts, Ninaasam Theatre Institute, Heggodu in 1985-86. He completed a Certificate Course in Cinema and Drama writing, at New York University in 1996.

Nicknames 
He is called 'Nageya Sardar' by Shimogga theatre lovers, 'Nage Natakagala Badshah' by Udupi Manipal people, 'Nagegadala Navika' by Bellary art lovers and 'Rangabhumiya Super Star' by Karnataka press.

Theater 
Most of Sirdeshpande's plays have run for over 500 shows, and include the Kannada plays All The Best, Rashichakra, Olave jeevana Shakshatkara, Neenaanaadre Naaneenena, Sahi Ri Sahi, Ondata Bhatraddu, Andhayuga, Sahebaru Baruttare, Miss Point, Dil Mange More, and Hingadre Dot Comedy.

Sirdeshpande has used his plays to support Bharatiya Janata Party election campaigns in Karnataka during State elections.

Film 
Sirdeshpande directed and produced a movie called Idea Madyara and contributed film scripts for Rama Shama Bhama, Matha, Jootatata, Dhimaku, Shri Danammadevi, Student, Tutturi, and Atithi. He was associate director of Atithi. He worked on films in different languages such as Shaadi ke After Effects in Hindi and On Duty Chovvistaas in Marathi.

Sirdeshpande is based in Bangalore where he is producing Kannada feature film Haadu Hakki Haadu and shooting Very Good.

Recognition 

 Rajyotsava Award 2010 – Award in Karnataka
 Sunfeast-Udaya Award 2006 for Best Dialogues - Rama Shama Bhama film
 Aryabhatta award in 2003
 Mayur Award in 2005
 Abhinaya Bharati Award in 2008 Rangadhruva Award in 2008
 Globalman International Award in 2008

References

External links
 The Hindu - 6 June 2008 Lights, camera, action!
 The Hindu - 9 August 2007: ‘Ranga sambhrama’ back in Hubli
 The Hindu - 2 February 2007: Laughing all the way
 The Hindu - 23 September 2005: Cultural activities shape students' personality
 Deccan Herald - 12 December 2004: Wishing you ‘All the best’
 The Hindu - 26 April 2004: 
 The Indian Express - 5 April 2004: Culture gloss to BJP campaign

Indian theatre directors
Indian male stage actors
Year of birth missing (living people)
Living people
Kannada people
People from Hubli
Kannada dramatists and playwrights
Indian male dramatists and playwrights
Dramatists and playwrights from Karnataka
Recipients of the Rajyotsava Award 2010